Hayang Heo clan was one of the most well-known Korean clans. Their Bon-gwan was in Gyeongsan, North Gyeongsang Province. According to studies in 2015, the number of Hayang Heo clan members was 20608. He was a 33rd descendant of Heo Hwang-ok who was the wife of Suro of Geumgwan Gaya, the first king of Geumgwan Gaya. He began Hayang Heo clan and made Haju their registered locality because he served as a Hojang during Goryeo period.

See also 
 Korean clan names of foreign origin

References

External links